Joe Cipriano is an American voice over actor, radio and TV on-air personality, and author.

Early life and education
Cipriano was born September 8, 1954, in Waterbury, Connecticut. He attended Watertown High School.

Career
Cipriano began his career as a broadcaster in Waterbury, Connecticut, while in high school. He has worked for the NBC, ABC, Fox and CBS TV and radio networks.

His radio career includes having hosted The World Chart Show from 1995 to 2004. From 1987 to 1992, Cipriano produced and hosted two shows that aired in Tokyo, Yokohama, Osaka and Kobe, Japan: the L.A. Express and Toyota California Classics.

He has worked as an on-air personality using various names, including his birthname (Dave Cipriano), Dave Donovan, and Tom Collins, for the following radio stations:
KIIS-FM – Los Angeles
KKHR – Los Angeles (CBS Hitradio)
KHTZ-FM – Los Angeles (K-Hits)
WRQX – Washington, D.C. (ABC-Q107)
WKYS – Washington, D.C. (NBC)
WDRC AM/FM – Hartford, Connecticut
WWCO AM/FM – Waterbury, Connecticut

Voice-over work 
While still working in radio, Cipriano began picking up voice-over work in commercials. He then became an announcer for Fox and CBS. Cipriano has announced Emmy and Grammy award shows. Cipriano was one of the candidates to replace Charlie O'Donnell on Wheel of Fortune, performing as guest announcer for a week in 2011. He has announced shows for NBC and is the announcer for the Food Network.

Cipriano is the voice-over announcer in the video game Candy Crush Saga.

Cipriano uses a Neumann U87i microphone for his voice-over work.

Book
Cipriano and his wife Ann co-authored his autobiography Living On Air: Adventures in Broadcasting, which was independently released in 2013.

Awards
Cipriano's book Living on Air was given two awards in November 2014 in the 1st annual Voice Arts Awards in the audio book narration category for both biography and author performance.

References

External links

Official Site

The Official Site of the Top Network Voices in America

Living people
American radio personalities
Radio and television announcers
American male voice actors
Actors from Waterbury, Connecticut
Game show announcers
20th-century American male actors
21st-century American male actors
American people of Italian descent
1954 births